Akwa Ibom State Broadcasting Corporation (abbreviated AKBC) UHF channel 45, is a state-owned television station in Uyo, Akwa Ibom. Akwa Ibom Broadcasting Corporation was established on 4 April 1988 and is the first and only local television station. AKBC provides both television and radio services. It transmits in 90.528MHZ. AKBC television transmits from Ntak Inyang.

AKBC was commissioned officially by the military Governor of Akwa Ibom, Idongesit Nkanga on 27 July 1991.

References 

Television channels and stations established in 1988
Television stations in Nigeria
Mass media in Akwa Ibom State